Hiperasia (sometimes spelled HiperAsia) is the fourth studio album by Spanish musician el Guincho. It was released on 12 February 2016 by Everlasting Records and Canada Editorial.

Critical reception

At Metacritic, which assigns a weighted rating out of 100 to reviews from mainstream critics, the album has an average score of 72 based on 9 reviews, indicating "generally favorable reviews".

Track listing
All tracks are written by Pablo Díaz-Reixa, except "Cómix", written by Díaz-Reixa and María Rodríguez.

Personnel
Credits adapted from Bandcamp.

 Pablo-Díaz Reixa – production; arrangement; mixing
 Brian Hernández – production; arrangement; mixing
 Mala Rodríguez – featured artist (track 2)
 Vlado Meller – mastering
 Adrià Cañameras – artwork

References

2016 albums
Albums produced by el Guincho
Canada Editorial albums
El Guincho albums